The Iowa State Cyclones college football team competes as part of the National Collegiate Athletic Association (NCAA) Division I Football Bowl Subdivision (FBS), and represents the Iowa State University in the Big 12 Conference (Big 12). All-America selections are individual player recognitions made after each season when numerous publications release lists of their ideal team. The NCAA recognizes five All-America lists: the Associated Press (AP), American Football Coaches Association (AFCA), the Football Writers Association of America (FWAA), Sporting News (TSN), and the Walter Camp Football Foundation (WC). In order for an honoree to earn a "consensus" selection, he must be selected as first team in three of the five lists recognized by the NCAA, and "unanimous" selections must be selected as first team in all five lists.

Since the establishment of the team in 1892, Iowa State has had 16 players honored a total of 24 times as First Team All-America for their performance on the field of play. Included in these selections are 4 consensus selections, 2 of which were unanimous selections. The most significant and recent All-American from Iowa State came after the 2020 season, when Breece Hall was named a unanimous First Team All-America, the first in Iowa State Cyclone history. Hall was also selected along with 2020 teammates Charlie Kolar, Mike Rose, and JaQuan Bailey.

Key

Selectors

Selections

See also
Iowa State Cyclones football
History of Iowa State Cyclones football
List of Iowa State Cyclones football seasons
Iowa State Cyclones football statistical leaders
List of Iowa State Cyclones in the NFL Draft

References

Iowa State Cyclones

Iowa State Cyclones football All-Americans